Urko Olazabal Ortiz de Zarate (born 1978) is a Spanish actor.

He is known for his role as Luis Carrasco in the film Maixabel by Icíar Bollain.

Among the awards he has received are the Goya Award (2022), the Feroz Award (2022), the CEC Award (2022) and the Union of Basque Actors and Actresses Award (2022).

Life and career 
He studied at Urretxindorra ikastola (Bilbao). She graduated in sculpture from the University of the Basque Country (UPV-EHU). He later trained in acting and drama at the BAI Performing Arts Training Center in Barakaldo where he graduated (2012-2016), and where he coincided with the actress María Cerezuela.

Later he developed his professional career as an actor in film and television series, mainly in the Basque Country. In addition to his career as an actor, he has written and directed two short films: Anujin (awarded for his script at the Medina del Campo Film Week) and Mithyabadi.

In 2022 he won the Goya Award, the Feroz Award and the Círculo de Escritores Cinematográficos Award for his portrayal of Luis Carrasco in the film Maixabel by Icíar Bollain.

Private life 
He underwent lymphoma and cancer.

Filmography

Films 

 2023, Teresa, dir. Paula Ortiz
 2022, 13 exorcismos, dir. Jacobo Martínez
 2021, Maixabel, dir. Icíar Bollain
 2020, Ane Is Missing, dir. David Pérez Sañudo
 2017, Errementari, dir. Paul Urkijo
 2016, Ira - Wrath, dir. Jota Aronak

Television 

 2023, Reina Roja
 2021, La que se avecina
 2020, Patria
 2020, Caminantes
 2018, La víctima número 8

Awards 

 2022, Goya Award (winner)
 2022, Feroz Award (winner)
 2022, CEC Award (winner)

References 

1978 births
Living people
Spanish actors
Basque actors
University of the Basque Country alumni
BAI Performing Arts Training Center alumni
Goya Award winners